Qatari nationality law is based mostly on jus sanguinis. Qatari citizens enjoy freedom of movement between other Gulf Cooperation Council member states.

By birth 
Children born in Qatar are not granted Qatari citizenship at birth.

By descent 
Any person who can demonstrate Qatari descent may apply to be a citizen of Qatar, depending on certain conditions.
Any person born to a Qatari father irrespective of their place of birth are Qatari citizens by descent.

By naturalization 
Foreigners may be granted citizenship if they fulfil the following conditions
Lawful residence in the State of Qatar for no less than 25 consecutive years before applying for citizenship.
Availability of legitimate means to earn one's living and meet one's needs.
Good conduct and behavior, in addition to absence of previous conviction by final ruling in a crime of dishonor or mistrust, whether inside or outside Qatar.

By marriage 
The wife of a naturalized person may be, by an Emiri decision, granted Qatari nationality by virtue of her husband, provided that her stay with him in Qatar extends for a period of at least five years from the date her husband acquired Qatari nationality. The wife will not lose her citizenship in the event that the marriage contract is broken.

Dual citizenship 
Qatar does not recognize dual citizenship which are not permitted by Qatar Government Holding another citizenship that's not allowed may lead to the revoking of Qatari citizenship.

Loss of Qatari citizenship 
The person may lose Qatari citizenship in the following cases:
 the person joins the military service of a foreign country.
 the person works for a foreign government that is in war with Qatar.
 the person takes up a foreign nationality.
Citizens are allowed to voluntarily give up Qatari citizenship.

Travel freedom

In 2016, Qatari citizens had visa-free or visa on arrival access to 79 countries and territories, ranking the Qatari passport 60th in the world according to the Visa Restrictions Index.

References 

Nationality law
Nationality law